Hermann von Siebenthal (27 December 1934 – 31 March 2014) was a Swiss equestrian. He competed in the team jumping event at the 1972 Summer Olympics.

References

1934 births
2014 deaths
Swiss male equestrians
Olympic equestrians of Switzerland
Equestrians at the 1972 Summer Olympics